Indian Cave State Park is a public recreation and historic preservation area covering nearly  along the Missouri River in southeast Nebraska. The state park preserves a cave with prehistoric petroglyphs as well as the partially reconstructed village of St. Deroin established in 1853 as part of the former Nemaha Half-Breed Reservation.

Some of the carvings within Indian Cave are believed to be several thousand years old, but their exact period and cultural affiliations are undetermined. The park offers 22 miles of hiking and biking trails, 16 miles of equestrian trails, camping, picnic facilities, fishing areas, and boating access to the Missouri River.

References

External links

Indian Cave State Park Nebraska Game and Parks Commission
Indian Cave State Park Map Nebraska Game and Parks Commission

Missouri River
Native American history of Nebraska
State parks of Nebraska
Pre-statehood history of Nebraska
Protected areas established in 1962
1962 establishments in Nebraska
Protected areas of Nemaha County, Nebraska
Protected areas of Richardson County, Nebraska
Rock art in North America
Rock shelters in the United States